Parsifal is a 1982 West German-French opera film directed by Hans-Jürgen Syberberg, based on the opera of the same name by Richard Wagner. It was shown out of competition at the 1982 Cannes Film Festival.

The soundtrack is a complete performance of the opera, but the imagery used is a melange including medieval costume, puppetry, Nazi relics and a giant death mask of Wagner. The Grail itself is represented by Wagner's Bayreuth Theatre, and Parsifal's key transformation is portrayed with a change of actor to an androgynous but deliberately female-suggesting form in order to achieve a union of male and female at the conclusion of Act II.

Cast
 Armin Jordan - Amfortas / Music Conductor
 Robert Lloyd - Gurnemanz
 Martin Sperr - Titurel
 Michael Kutter - Parsifal 1
 Edith Clever - Kundry
 Thomas Fink - 2nd Squire
 Rudolph Gabler - 1st Knight of the Grail
 Monika Gärtner - 1st Squire
 Reiner Goldberg - Parsifal (voice)
 Aage Haugland - Klingsor
 Karin Krick - Parsifal 2
 David Luther - Young Parsifal
 David Meyer - 3rd Squire
 Yvonne Minton - Kundry (voice)
 Bruno Romani-Versteeg - 3rd Knight of the Grail
 Judith Schmidt - 4th Squire
 Wolfgang Schöne - Amfortas (voice)
 Amelie Syberberg - Bearer of the Grail
 Urban von Klebelsberg - 2nd Knight of the Grail

Production
Prior to making Parsifal, Hans-Jürgen Syberberg had made three films which bring up the subject of Richard Wagner: Ludwig: Requiem for a Virgin King from 1972, The Confessions of Winifred Wagner from 1975 and Hitler: A Film from Germany from 1977. The Confessions of Winifred Wagner had upset the descendants of Wagner, which had the effect that Syberberg was not allowed to use any existing recording of the opera for the soundtrack of Parsifal. A production was instead arranged specifically for the film, with Armin Jordan as conductor. The film was shot entirely in studio in 35 days, in Bavaria Atelier in Munich. The budget was just above three million Deutsche Mark.

Reception
The New York Times''' John Rockwell wrote: "Hans Jurgen Syberberg's film version of Richard Wagner's music drama, Parsifal, should enthrall both film lovers and Wagner fans. Mr. Syberberg's work represents not only the summation of his career thus far, but is as gripping, strange and, in the end, devotionally faithful a staging as any Wagner opera has received in our time." Rockwell continued: "Just why Mr. Syberberg's scenic innovations don't seem as disturbing as other modern directorial innovations - Patrice Chéreau's Bayreuth Ring, for instance - is hard to explain. ... [I]nstead of their shocking us away from the romantic spell of the music, they reinforce that spell. It's as if Wagner's hypnotic allure and Brecht's intellectualized alienation have been somehow mystically united." Graham Bradshaw wrote in London Review of Books: "Using clever front projection techniques, [Syberberg] provides a rapid background commentary on the main dramatic action: this is sometimes contrived and disruptive, but more frequently suggests the reflexes and ricochets of a mind that is actively engaging with Parsifal."

References

Notes
 Hans Jürgen Syberberg and His Film of Wagner's'' Parsifal, by Solveig Olsen, University Press of America, 2006.

External links

About the Film

1982 films
1980s musical films
1980s German-language films
German musical films
West German films
French musical films
Films directed by Hans-Jürgen Syberberg
Arthurian films
Films about the Holy Grail
Films based on operas
Films based on works by Richard Wagner
Opera films
Parsifal
1980s German films